Mohammad Sadegh Barani (September 9, 1991) is an Iranian football midfielder who plays for Saipa in the Persian Gulf Pro League.

Club career
He joined Rah Ahan in 2010–11 season and just played 3 times as a substitute. In June 2012 he joined Isfahani side, Zob Ahan, with a three-years contract which keeping him in the club until end of 2014–15 season.

Paykan
Barani joined Paykan in the summer of 2013 and he was named club captain in 2015. He helped Paykan promote back to the Persian Gulf Pro League in 2016.

Club Career Statistics
Last Update: 27 May 2018 

 Assist Goals

References

External links
 Mohammad Sadegh Barani at Persian League
 

Iranian footballers
Living people
Esteghlal F.C. players
Rah Ahan players
Zob Ahan Esfahan F.C. players
Paykan F.C. players
1991 births
Iran under-20 international footballers
Association football midfielders
Shahin Bushehr F.C. players